Two ships of the United States Navy have been named USS McDermut for David McDermut.

United States Navy ship names